Cassell's Book of Knowledge was an alphabetical eight-volume encyclopedia published under a range of titles including The Book of Knowledge and The New Book of Knowledge. The series was printed in London by The Waverley Book Company, Ltd. in various years beginning in 1922. The essays were written in a now dated style, but designed to appeal to both adults and children. The books were edited by multiple editors including Harold FB Wheeler (circa 1935), John Alexander Hammerton (circa 1950), and Gordon Stowell (1955). The New Book of Knowledge, an updated set, appeared circa 1959.

References

British children's books
British encyclopedias
Children's encyclopedias
English-language encyclopedias
Publications established in 1922
1922 establishments in England
20th-century encyclopedias